Lokasenna (Old Norse: 'The Flyting of Loki', or 'Loki's Verbal Duel') is one of the poems of the Poetic Edda. The poem presents flyting between the gods and Loki. It is written in the ljóðaháttr metre, typical for wisdom verse. Lokasenna is believed to be a 10th-century poem.

Loki, amongst other things, accuses the gods of moralistic sexual impropriety, the practice of seiðr (sorcery), and bias. Not ostensibly the most serious of allegations, these elements are, however, said ultimately to lead to the onset of Ragnarök in the Eddic poem Völuspá. However, Lokasenna does not directly state that Loki's binding is as a consequence of the killing of Baldr. This is explicitly stated only in Snorri Sturluson's Prose Edda.

Lee M. Hollander, in his introduction to his translation of the poem, claims that it was in no sense a popular lay and suggests we should not necessarily believe that the accusations of the "sly god" were an accepted part of the lore.

Plot
The setting is a feast given by the sea god Ægir. In continuity, the prose introduction says: "Ægir, also named Gymir, had made ale for the Æsir, when he had received the great kettle of which was told" (see Hymiskviða). Thor did not attend, but his wife Sif came in his stead as did Bragi and his wife Iðunn. Tyr, by this time one-handed as a consequence of his sacrifice of his hand in the shackling of Loki's son, the wolf Fenrisulfr, attended, as did Niord and his wife Skaði, Freyr and Freyja, as well as Vidar, the son of Odin. Many other Vanir, Æsir, and also elves were there.

The servants of Ægir, Fimafeng and Eldir, did a thorough job of welcoming the guests; Loki was jealous of the praise being heaped upon them and slew Fimafeng. The gods were angry with Loki and drove him out of the hall, before returning to their carousing. On returning Loki encountered Eldir.

He threatened him and bade him reveal what the gods were talking about in their cups. Eldir's response was that they were discussing their might at arms, and that Loki was not welcomed.

Loki then enters the hall of Ægir after trading insults and threats with Eldir. A hush falls. Loki calls upon the rules of hospitality, demanding a seat and ale. Bragi then responds that he is unwelcome. Loki demands fulfillment of an ancient oath sworn with Odin that they should drink together. Odin asked his son Vidar to make a space for Loki.

Vidar rises and pours a drink for Loki. Before Loki drains his draught, he utters a toast to the gods but pointedly excludes Bragi from it. Bragi offers Loki a horse, a ring and a sword to placate him; Loki, however, is spoiling for a fight, and insults Bragi by questioning his courage. Bragi's response is that it would be contrary to the rules of correct behaviour to fight within his hosts' hall, but were they back in Asgard then things would be different. Iðunn, Bragi's wife, holds him back. Loki then insults Iðunn, calling her sexually loose. Gefjon is the next to speak and then Loki turns his spite on her. Odin then attempts to take a grip, as do (in turn), Freyja, Njord, Tyr, Freyr and Byggvir. The exchanges between Odin and Loki are particularly vitriolic.

Eventually Thor turns up at the party, and he is not to be placated, nor withheld. Alternating with Loki's insults to him, he says four times that he will use his hammer to knock Loki's head off if he continues. Loki replies that for Thor alone he will leave the hall, because his threats are the only ones he fears. He then leaves.

Finally there is a short piece of prose summarizing the tale of Loki's binding, which is told in fuller form in the Gylfaginning section of Snorri Sturluson's Prose Edda. Loki is chased by the gods, and caught after an unsuccessful attempt at disguising himself as a salmon. The entrails of his son Nari are used to bind him to three rocks above which Skaði places a serpent to drip venom on him. Loki's wife Sigyn remains by his side with a bowl to catch the venom; however, whenever she leaves to empty the bowl, venom falls on Loki, causing him to writhe in agony; this writhing was said to be the cause of earthquakes. The text says that Loki's other son, Narfi, was turned into a wolf, but does not make clear that he tears his brother apart; also in the Gylfaginning version it is a son of Loki named Váli whom the Æsir transform into a wolf and who kills Narfi. Some editors have therefore chosen to read the names Nari and Narvi as a mistake in the manuscript, and transcribe Nari as Váli. Nari and Narfi are otherwise considered to be variations of the same name.

Excerpts
Thorpe's Translation.

Loki:
"Hail, Æsir!
Hail, Asyniur!
And ye, all-holy gods!
all, save that one man,
who sits within there,
Bragi, on yonder bench."

Bragi:
"I know that were I without,
as I am now within,
the hall of Ægir,
I thy head would
bear in my hand,
and so for lying punish thee."

Loki:
"Valiant on thy seat art thou, Bragi!
but so thou shouldst not be,
Bragi, the bench's pride!
Go and fight,
if thou art angry;
a brave man sits not considering."

Idunn stepped in to protect her husband.

Idunn:
"I pray thee, Bragi!
let avail the bond of children,
and of all adopted sons,
and to Loki speak not
in reproachful words,
in Ægir's hall."

Loki:
"Be silent, Idunn!
of all women I declare thee
most fond of men,
since thou thy arms,
carefully washed, didst twine
round thy brother's murderer."

Idunn:
"Loki I address not
with opprobrious words,
in Ægir's hall.
Bragi I soothe,
by beer excited.
I desire not that angry ye fight."

Gefjun:
"Why will ye, Æsir twain,
here within,
strive with reproachful words?
Lopt perceives not
that he is deluded,
and is urged on by fate."

Loki:
"Be silent, Gefjun!
I will now just mention,
how that fair youth
thy mind corrupted,
who thee a necklace gave,
and around whom thou thy limbs didst twine?"

Odin interfered, but Loki called him "unmanly" as well.

Odin:
"Knowest thou that I gave
to those I ought not –
victory to cowards?
Thou was eight winters
on the earth below,
milked cow as a woman,
and didst there bear children.
Now that, methinks, betokens a base nature."

Loki:
"But, it is said, thou wentest
with tottering steps in Samsö,
and knocked at houses as a Vala. (Vala: seeress)
In likeness of a fortune teller,
thou wentest among people;
Now that, methinks, betokens a base nature."

Frigg tried to defend her husband.

Frigg:
"Your doings
ye should never
publish among men,
what ye, Æsir twain,
did in days of yore.
Ever forgotten be men's former deeds!"

Loki:
"Be thou silent, Frigg!
Thou art Fjorgynn's daughter,
and ever hast been lustful,
since Ve and Vili, it is said,
thou, Vidrir's wife, didst (Vidrir: another name of Odin, Ve and Vili: Odin's brothers)
both to thy bosom take."

Freyja:
"Mad art thou, Loki!
in recounting
thy foul misdeeds.
Frigg, I believe,
knows all that happens,
although she says it not."

Loki:
"Be thou silent, Freyja!
I know thee full well;
thou art not free from vices:
of the Æsir and the Alfar,
that are herein,
each has been thy paramour."

Freyja:
"False is thy tongue.
Henceforth it will, I think,
prate no good to thee.
Wroth with thee are the Æsir,
and the Asyniur.
Sad shalt thou home depart."

Loki:
"Be silent, Freyja!
Thou art a sorceress,
and with much evil blended;
since against thy brother thou
the gentle powers excited.
And then, Freyja! what didst thou do?"

Njörðr:
"It is no great wonder,
if silk-clad dames
get themselves husbands, lovers;
but 'tis a wonder that a wretched man,
that has borne children, (i.e. the horse Sleipnir)
should herein enter."

Loki:
"Cease now, Njörðr!
in bounds contain thyself;
I will no longer keep it secret:
it was with thy sister
thou hadst such a son (i.e. Freyr)
hardly worse than thyself."

Týr:
"Freyr is best
of all the exalted gods
in the Æsir's courts:
no maid he makes to weep,
no wife of man,
and from bonds looses all."

Not only mocking Týr's wound (his arm was bitten by Fenrir), Loki also called him a cuckold.

Loki:
"Be silent, Týr;
to thy wife it happened
to have a son by me.
Nor rag nor penny ever
hadst thou, poor wretch!
for this injury."

Freyr:
"I the wolf see lying (The wolf: Loki is father of Fenrir)
at the river's mouth,
until the powers are swept away.
So shalt thou be bound,
if thou art not silent,
thou framer of evil."

Loki:
"With gold thou boughtest
Gýmir's daughter, (i.e. Freyr's wife, Gerd)
and so gavest away thy sword:
but when Muspell's sons (i.e. Fire Giants, whose leader would slay the unarmed Freyr at Ragnarök)
through the dark forest ride,
thou, unhappy, wilt not
have wherewith to fight."

Heimdallr:
"Loki, thou art drunk,
and hast lost thy wits.
Why dost thou not leave off, Loki?
But drunkenness
so rules every man,
that he knows not of his garrulity."

Loki:
"Be silent, Heimdallr!
For thee in early days
was that hateful life decreed:
with a wet back
thou must ever be,
and keep watch as guardian of the gods."

Skaði:
"Thou art merry, Loki!
Not long wilt thou
frisk with an unbound tail;
for thee, on a rock's point,
with the entrails of thy ice-cold son,
the gods will bind."

Loki:
"Milder was thou of speech
to Laufey's son, (Laufey´s son: the giant Loki)
when to thy bed thou didst invite me.
Such matters must be mentioned,
if we accurately must
recount our vices."

Sif went to pour for Loki.

Sif:
"Hail to thee, Loki!
and this cool cup receive,
full of old mead:
at least me alone,
among the blameless Æsir race,
leave stainless."

Loki:
"So alone shouldst thou be,
hadst thou strict and prudent been
towards thy mate;
but one I know,
and, I think, know him well,
a favoured rival of Hlorridi,
and that is the wily Loki."

After this, Thor came in and drove Loki away.

Thor:
"Silence, thou impure being!
My mighty hammer, Mjöllnir,
shall stop thy prating.
I will thy head
from thy neck strike;
then will thy life be ended."

References

Bibliography

External links
 MyNDIR (My Norse Digital Image repository) illustrations from Victorian and Edwardian  retellings of Lokasenna. Clicking on the thumbnail will give you the full image and information concerning it.

English translations
 Lokasenna Translation and commentary by Henry A. Bellows
 Ægisdrekka, eða Lokasenna, eða Lokaglepsa Translation by Benjamin Thorpe
 The Feast of Ager Translation by A. S. Cottle

Old Norse editions
 Lokasenna Sophus Bugge's edition of the manuscript text

Eddic poetry
Loki
Sources of Norse mythology